Ole Henrik Laub (3 December 1937 in Aarhus – 22 October 2019) was a Danish novelist and author of short-stories and children books. He was also an art painter and cartoonist.

Laub made his debut in 1967 with  Et Sværd Dyppet i Honning, a collection of short stories. He wrote more than fifty books, short stories, novels, and books for children.  He also wrote for the stage, for radiodrama and plays for TV. Many of his stories are about people in Danish provincial towns.

Novels

 Fondamenta Nuove 1996
 Hovedrollen 1997
 Alle Himlens Farver 2002 
 Fugle flyver hjem 2005
 Fjolsernes Konge (King of Fools) 2007

References

1937 births
2019 deaths
Danish children's writers
Danish male novelists
People from Aarhus
20th-century Danish novelists
20th-century Danish male writers